Jordan Phillips (born September 21, 1992) is an American football defensive tackle who is a free agent. He played college football at Oklahoma.

Early years
Phillips attended Circle High School in Towanda, Kansas, where he played high school football. He was rated by Scout.com as a five-star recruit and Rivals.com as a four-star. He committed to the University of Oklahoma to play college football.

College career
Phillips played at Oklahoma from 2011 to 2014. As a freshman in 2011, he was redshirted. As a redshirt freshman in 2012, he appeared in 12 games, recording 12 tackles. Phillips played in only four games his sophomore season in 2013 due to a back injury. He had seven tackles and 1.5 sacks before the injury. Phillips returned from the injury in 2014. He finished the year with 31 tackles and two sacks.

After his junior season, Phillips entered the 2015 NFL Draft.

Professional career

Miami Dolphins 
Phillips was drafted with the 52nd overall pick in the second round by the Miami Dolphins of the 2015 NFL Draft. During his rookie year in 2015, Phillips played 15 games making 19 tackles, 2 sacks, and 4 passes defended.

Phillips entered the 2018 season as a starting defensive tackle. However his playing time dipped as the season progressed, leading to an outburst on the sideline about his playing time in a Week 4 blowout loss to the New England Patriots. On October 2, 2018, Phillips was waived by the Dolphins.

Buffalo Bills 
On October 3, 2018, Phillips was claimed off waivers by the Buffalo Bills.

On March 4, 2019, Phillips re-signed with the Bills.
In week 5 against the Tennessee Titans, Phillips sacked Marcus Mariota three times in the 14-7 win. Phillips emerged as a premier pass rusher for the Bills, racking up 9.5 sacks in the 2019 season.

Arizona Cardinals 
On April 6, 2020, Phillips signed a three–year contract with the Arizona Cardinals.

In Week 2 against the Washington Football Team, Phillips recorded his first sack as a Cardinal, a strip sack on Dwayne Haskins which was recovered by teammate Chandler Jones during the 30–15 win.
In Week 6 against the Dallas Cowboys on Monday Night Football, Phillips recovered a fumble lost by running back Ezekiel Elliott and forced a fumble on Elliott on the Cowboys' next drive of the game during the 38–10 win. He was placed on injured reserve on November 19, 2020 with a hamstring injury. He was activated on December 12, 2020. He aggravated the hamstring injury in Week 14 and was placed on injured reserve on December 19, ending his season.

On September 2, 2021, Phillips was placed on injured reserve to start the season. He was activated on October 16.

On March 16, 2022, Phillips was released by the Cardinals.

Buffalo Bills (second stint)
On March 17, 2022, Phillips signed with the Buffalo Bills on a one year deal.

NFL career statistics

Regular season

Postseason

References

External links
Oklahoma Sooners bio
Miami Dolphins bio
Buffalo Bills bio
Arizona Cardinals bio

1992 births
Living people
People from Towanda, Kansas
Players of American football from Wichita, Kansas
American football defensive tackles
Oklahoma Sooners football players
Miami Dolphins players
Buffalo Bills players
Arizona Cardinals players